Storm and Stress is the English translation of Sturm und Drang, a German literary movement that emphasized the volatile emotional life of the individual

Storm and Stress or Sturm und Drang may also refer to:

Sturm und Drang
Sturm und Drang (play), the original play by Friedrich Maximilian von Klinger to give the name to the movement
Sturm und Drang (band), hard rock band from Vaasa, Finland
Sturm & Drang Tour 2002, live album by KMFDM from a tour with the same name
Sturm & Drang Tour 2002 (video), live DVD by KMFDM
VII: Sturm und Drang, 2015 studio album by Lamb of God

Storm and Stress
Storm & Stress, American band
Storm & Stress (album), debut album of the band